Red Rock railway station stood in Red Rock, a hamlet between Standish and Haigh, originally in Lancashire now within Greater Manchester, England. The railway station was on the Lancashire Union Railway line that ran from Blackburn via Chorley to Wigan before eventually joining the St Helens Railway.

The former down waiting room at the station was owned and used by the residents of Haigh Hall from the station's inception until the 1940s. The station buildings and goods yard now form part of a private residence.

References

External links
the station and local lines Rail Map Online
The station on a navigable late 1940s OS map npe Maps
The station on navigable old OS maps, with modern satellite overlay National Library of Scotland
The station, line and mileages Railway Codes

Disused railway stations in the Metropolitan Borough of Wigan
Former London and North Western Railway stations
Former Lancashire Union Railway stations
Railway stations in Great Britain opened in 1869
Railway stations in Great Britain closed in 1949